KSW may refer to:

 Kansas Southwestern Railway, a defunct United States railroad company
 Kearny Street Workshop, a multidisciplinary arts organization in San Francisco, California
 Keeping Scientology Working, an internal document for Scientologists, written by L. Ron Hubbard
 The King's School, Worcester
 The Kootenay School of Writing, a writers' collective based in Vancouver, Canada
 Konfrontacja Sztuk Walki, a Polish Mixed Martial Arts promotion
 Kiryat Shmona Airport, an airport near Kiryat Shmona, Israel (IATA code: KSW)
 S'gaw Karen language, ISO 639 code ksw